Clifford the Big Red Dog is an animated children's television series which is a reboot to the book series of the same name written by Norman Bridwell, and the 2000 original series created by Deborah Forte and produced by Mike Young Productions, and is the third series in the franchise after the prequel spin-off Clifford's Puppy Days, which was also produced by Mike Young Productions.

In addition to being a reboot, it is also a sequel, because PBS lists it as being the third season.
 Clifford is voiced by Adam Sanders, replacing John Ritter in the role since the latter's death in 2003.

It was released on December 6, 2019, on Amazon Prime Video, and premiered a day later on PBS Kids. The second part of season 1 was released on February 7, 2020. The executive producers of the show include Jennifer Oxley, best known for co-creating Peg + Cat, and Vince Commisso of 9 Story Media Group.

The series revolves around Emily Elizabeth Howard, a young girl who owns Clifford, a big red dog who can speak to her for the first time since the late 1980s-early 1990s direct-to-video series. Together the two friends explore their island home, Birdwell Island, and embark on adventures.

Characters

Main
 Clifford (voiced by Adam Sanders) is a big red dog that grew once Emily, his owner, gave him massive amounts of her love and affection. He now wears a studded collar. Unlike the books, the 2000 television series, and Clifford's Puppy Days, Clifford can speak to Emily, but only when they're alone, much like the original 1988 home video series.
 Emily Elizabeth Howard (voiced by Hannah Levinson) is an affectionate 8-year-old girl and the owner of Clifford. Unlike the original series and Clifford's Puppy Days, she now wears a light yellow shirt and black leggings, and has a cyan hair clip, bracelets, socks, and shoes.
 Mrs. Howard (voiced by Alison Brooks) is Emily's mother. Like in the books, Mrs. Howard has black hair, while in the original TV series and Clifford's Puppy Days, she was a blonde.
 Mr. Howard (voiced by John Cleland) is Emily's father. Like in the books, Mr. Howard has short brown hair and wears glasses, while in the original TV series and Clifford's Puppy Days, he had fully grown brown hair and perfect eyesight.

Supporting
 Samantha Mulberry (voiced by Jenna Weir) is Emily's best friend and Bailey's owner. She wears an orange shirt, blue jeans, bracelets, and blue shoes.
 Rayla Mulberry and Dr. Mulberry (voiced by Julie Lemieux and Maggie Cassella): Samantha's mothers.
 Jack Morgan (voiced by Jasiah Stewart) is one of Emily's friends.
 Pablo Flores (voiced by Niko Ceci) is one of Emily's friends. He has a blue shirt, blue pants and green shoes. In addition, Pablo is Hero's owner.
 Fire Chief Franklin (voiced by John Cleland) is Tucker's owner. He is Birdwell Island's principal firefighter.
 Ms. Clayton (voiced by Raven Dauda) is Willa's owner, and Birdwell Island's librarian. She owns the Library, which is located on a boat.
 Ms. Ellerby (voiced by Alison Brooks) is Birdwell Island's lifeguard.
 Mr. Basu (voiced by Sugith Varughese) is Birdwell Island's mail carrier.
 Fisherman Charlie (voiced by Sugith Varughese) is Hudson's owner.

Supporting (Animals)
 Bailey (voiced by Bahia Watson) is one of Clifford's dog friends. She is an Australian Shepherd who wears a pink bow. Samantha is her owner. 
 Tucker (voiced by Julie Lemieux) is one of Clifford's dog friends. He is a Dalmatian who wears a yellow collar. Fire Chief Franklin is his owner. 
 Willa (vocal effects provided by Hannah Levinson) is a grey kitten who is owned by Ms. Clayton, the librarian. In segments between Emily Elizabeth and Clifford's adventures, she is seen having her own adventures with animals who are more her size.
 Hero (voiced by Matt Folliott) is Pablo's dog. He is a beagle. His name derives from Pablo's hobby of reading about superheroes in comic books.
 Hudson (voiced by Markeda McKay) is Charlie's dog. She is a Yorkshire terrier.
 Shelly is Samantha's hermit crab.

Production
A reboot of Clifford the Big Red Dog was announced on May 16, 2018, by Scholastic, and released in late 2019. Scholastic and 100 Chickens Productions in the United States, and 9 Story Media Group in Canada produce the series.

On November 22, 2019, the theme song and a sneak peek clip of an episode were released.

In preparing for the role of the voice of Clifford, Adam Sanders stated that he watched episodes of the 2000s television series and studied John Ritter's performance as Clifford, stating that Ritter portrayed the character as very optimistic, very youthful and compassionate.

Episodes
The series has 39 22-minute episodes.
{{Episode table |background=#B50000 |overall= |title= |director= |writer= |aux2= |aux2T=Storyboard by |airdate=|released=y|prodcode= |episodes=

{{Episode list
| EpisodeNumber   = 27
| Title           = Rock-a-bye Clifford""The mysterious Library
| RTitle          =
| DirectedBy      = Geri Bertolo
| WrittenBy       = Stuart FriedelCraig Shemin
| Aux2            = Luke GustafsonMichelle Ku
| OriginalAirDate =  (Amazon Prime) (PBS Kids)
| ProdCode        = 327
| ShortSummary    = "Rock-a-bye Clifford": Emily is excited to go to a wedding for the first time ever! Clifford wants to go, but he's too big for the wedding door. So Emily holds a cousin to take care of Clifford while she is gone and they have fun. However, when going to bed, Clifford starts to miss Emily and her attention and begins howling uncontrollably. So everyone decides to sing a lullaby to remember that Emily will be always watching him.

"The mysterious Library: After accidentally making a mess in the library during story time, Clifford feels bad about the mess and wants to make things right. The next day, when everyone goes to the library to check out new books, they discover that the library is different, even clifford! Can Clifford discover what had happened with the library?

Willa moment: Willa wants to swim for the first time but she is nervous about her swim lessons. After failing to swim one day, she gives up hope about swimming, but when she discovers some floaties at a nearby store, she decides that swimming may be hard but important.
| LineColor       = B50000
}}

}}

 Reception Clifford the Big Red Dog received generally mixed reviews from critics, with parents praising it for its songs, morals, and format; but older fans of the original  disagreed, responding with negative reviews. Reasons for criticism included the removal of all the previous characters, switch of format and the inclusion of the LGBT parenting, among other reasons. 

Accolades

Broadcast
The first seven episodes of Clifford the Big Red Dog'' were released on Amazon Prime Video on December 6, 2019, while PBS Kids began airing the series the next day.

In Canada, the series aired on Knowledge Network and TVOKids.

In United Kingdom, the series premiered on February 13, 2023 on Sky Kids, as one of the channel's launch programmes.

References

External links
  on Amazon Prime Video
  on PBS Kids

2010s American animated television series
2020s American animated television series
2010s American children's comedy television series
2020s American children's comedy television series
2019 American television series debuts
2021 American television series endings
2010s Canadian animated television series
2020s Canadian animated television series
2010s Canadian children's television series
2020s Canadian children's television series
2019 Canadian television series debuts
2021 Canadian television series endings
American children's animated adventure television series
American children's animated comedy television series
American children's animated fantasy television series
American television shows based on children's books
Canadian children's animated adventure television series
Canadian children's animated comedy television series
Canadian children's animated fantasy television series
Canadian television shows based on children's books
Animated television series reboots
Clifford the Big Red Dog
English-language television shows
Amazon Prime Video original programming
Amazon Prime Video children's programming
PBS Kids shows
PBS original programming
Animated television series about children
Animated television series about dogs
Television series by 9 Story Media Group
Television series by Brown Bag Films
Television series by Amazon Studios
Animated television series by Amazon Studios